Ava Wong Davies is a British playwright of Chinese origin. Based in London, she writes for Exeunt Magazine, The Independent, The Stage, and gal-dem. She won the Sunday Times Harold Hobson Award for theatre criticism in 2018. She holds a BA degree in English Language and Literature from University College London (UCL).

Wong Davies is also a playwright of note. She attended writing workshops at Soho Theatre and Bush Theatre. In 2020, her play 'scum' was shortlisted for the Verity Bargate Award and the Tony Craze Award. Her play Graceland premiered at the Royal Court Theatre in 2023, to strong reviews.

References

British dramatists and playwrights